Pyaase Nain is a 1954 Hindi film starring Rehman.

Soundtrack

References

External links
 

1954 films
1950s Hindi-language films
Films scored by Bulo C. Rani
Indian black-and-white films